Altarus Records is a  classical music record label.

Featured musicians
 Donna Amato, piano
 Joseph Banowetz, piano
 Kevin Bowyer, organ
 Elizabeth Farnum, soprano
 Carlo Grante, piano
 Michael Habermann, piano
 Marc-André Hamelin, piano
 Charles Hopkins, piano
 Lukas Huisman, piano
 Tellef Johnson, piano
 Margaret Kampmeier, piano
 Geoffrey Douglas Madge, piano
 Murray McLachlan, piano
 Soheil Nasseri, piano
 Eiji Nishimura, piano
 John Ogdon, piano
 Jonathan Powell, piano
 Abel Sánchez-Aguilera, piano
 Yonty Solomon, piano
 Ronald Stevenson, piano
 Fredrik Ullén, piano
 Adam Wodnicki, piano

See also
 List of record labels

References

External links
Official site

American record labels
Classical music record labels